Taragarh Fort may refer to:

 Taragarh Fort, Ajmer, Rajasthan, India
 Taragarh Fort, a fort in Bundi, Rajasthan, India